Erin Rae (formerly Erin Rae & the Meanwhiles) is an American folk pop band from Nashville, Tennessee.

The band is led by singer Erin Rae McKaskle. According to Rolling Stone, Erin Rae "makes smooth-edged music for Sunday afternoons" and "her arrangements — anchored by pedal-steel guitar and the steady strum of an acoustic guitar — may be rooted in modern-day indie folk, but the songs themselves rustle up comparisons to Joni Mitchell and Jackson Browne".

History
Erin Rae began her singer/songwriter career as Erin Rae and the Meanwhiles in 2012 with the release of an EP titled Crazy Talk. In 2015, Erin Rae released her  debut full-length album with The Meanwhiles titled Soon Enough. The album was recorded in only two days.

In July 2015, Erin Rae and the Meanwhiles recorded a Daytrotter session at Big Light Studio in Nashville.

Erin Rae's second full-length album, Putting On Airs, was released in June 2018.

In 2021 she as a solo artist was inter alia part of the Newport Folk Festival in July.

Members
Erin Rae McKaskle (vocals, guitar)

Collaborators
Gerard G. “Jerry” Bernhardt III (production, Guitar, bass, vocals)
Dominic Billet (drums, bass, vocals)
Kevin Morby

Past members
Cori Bechler (vocals)
Graham Bechler (drums)
Kevin Whitsett (bass)
Brett Resnick (steel)
Mark Sloan (electric guitar)
Mark Fredson (keys)
Kristin Weber (fiddle, vocals)
Molly Parden (vocals)

Discography
Studio albums
Soon Enough (2015) prod. Michael Rinne 
Putting On Airs (2018) prod. Gerard G. “Jerry” Bernhardt III & Dan Knobler
Lighten Up (2022)
EPs
Crazy Talk (2012) prod. Graham Bechler
Philadelphia 4-track demos (2019) prod. Gerard G. “Jerry” Bernhardt III
Lagniappe Sessions EP Aquarium Drunkard (2019) prod. Gerard G. “Jerry” Bernhardt III
‘’’Singles’’’
Playing Old Games (2016) writ. Erin Rae + Pete Lindberg 
Gold Plated/Refugee (2019) prod. Gerard G. “Jerry” Bernhardt III & Dan Knobler
Merry Christmas Darling w/ Coco Reilly & Kate Bernhardt (2018)

References 

Musical groups from Nashville, Tennessee
Musical groups established in 2012
American folk musical groups
2012 establishments in Tennessee